The 1987–88 County Championship was the 46th season of the Liga IV, the fourth tier of the Romanian football league system. The champions of each county association play against one from a neighboring county in a playoff to gain promotion.

Promotion play-off 
Teams promoted to Divizia C without a play-off matches as teams from less represented counties in the third division.

 (AB) Energia Săsciori
 (TR) Petrolul Poeni
 (VL) Forestierul Băbeni
 (BT) CSM Bucecea
 
 (IS) Fortus Iași
 (DJ) Constructorul Șoimii Craiova
 (VN) Autobuzul Laminorul Focșani 

 Ilfov County did not enter a team in the play-offs.

The matches was played on 3 and 10 July 1988.

|-
||1–0||0–0
||1–2||1–5
||2–1||0–0
||1–0||3–1
||4–2||0–3
||5–2||0–2
||0–0||2–2
||4–0||2–2
||3–1||1–5
||1–2||0–3
||1–5||0–1
||1–1||0–1
||0–3||0–3
||1–0||0–0
||2–1||0–6
||2–0||0–1
||4–0||2–1
|}

County leagues

Arad County

Maramureș County

Neamț County

See also 
 1987–88 Divizia A
 1987–88 Divizia B
 1987–88 Cupa României

References

External links
 FRF

Liga IV seasons
4
Romania